The Holy Trinity, also known as The Big Three is the name given in horology to the 3 biggest watchmakers in the world. The watch brands are Patek Phillipe, Audemars Piguet and Vacheron Constantin, known for their complex and high-end movements. The classification dates back to the decades of 60 and 70  

Applying the concept of the Holy Trinity, concept with religious origin that derives from Christianity to wristwatches is based on the attention to detail in their craftsmanship and the rich tradition of the Holy Trinity of the Swiss watch industry, as the 3 references to have into account.

References

Watch manufacturing companies of Switzerland